The 1999 All-Ireland Senior Camogie Championship Final was the 68th All-Ireland Final and the deciding match of the 1999 All-Ireland Senior Camogie Championship, an inter-county camogie tournament for the top teams in Ireland.

Tipperary finally won an All-Ireland final at their eighth attempt. Kilkenny led 1-5 to 0-7 at half-time but Tipp outpaced them in the end.

References

All-Ireland Senior Camogie Championship Finals
All-Ireland Senior Camogie Championship Final
All-Ireland Senior Camogie Championship Final
All-Ireland Senior Camogie Championship Final, 1999